Gillian Margaret Bibby   (born 31 Aug 1945) is a New Zealand composer, pianist, writer and teacher. She was born in Lower Hutt, New Zealand, and studied at the University of Otago and Victoria University with Douglas Lilburn. She continued her studies in Berlin and Cologne with Aloys Kontarsky, Mauricio Kagel and Karlheinz Stockhausen. After completing her studies, she worked as a pianist, composer, music teacher and university lecturer in New Zealand.

Bibby has been active in several music-related organizations, serving as president and chair, and founded the CHAMPS Trust to offer opportunities for youth in music. She was awarded the Philip Neill prize in composition, the Kranichsteiner prize in composition and the Darmstadt prize for new music.

In the 2020 New Year Honours, Bibby was appointed a Member of the New Zealand Order of Merit, for services to music and music education.

Works
Selected works include:
11 Characters in Search of a Composer for orchestra or military band	
Aie! A Conversation Piece for tape	
Musik für drei Hörer (Music for 3 Listeners) for clavichord, voice, and percussion	
Sanctuary of Spirits, children's opera	
The Beasts, song cycle of 6 songs and 5 snatches	
You can't kiss the Tummy of a Caged Lion: Pavane pour un genre defunt for voices and chamber ensemble

Her music has been recorded and issued on CD, including:
Life, Love and Death
The Songs of the Morning: a story of music in early Antarctica
Douglas Lilburn: Salutes to Poet

References

1945 births
Living people
20th-century classical composers
New Zealand music teachers
Women classical composers
New Zealand classical composers
University of Otago alumni
Victoria University of Wellington alumni
Women music educators
Members of the New Zealand Order of Merit
20th-century women composers